Værøy Lighthouse is a coastal lighthouse in Værøy Municipality in Nordland county, Norway.  The lighthouse is built on a small peninsula southeast of the village of Sørland on the island of Værøya.  It was constructed in 1880 and automated in 1984. The lighthouse has not been used since 2008.

History
The red-topped tower was attached to a white lighthouse keeper's house. The light was lit from dusk to dawn from 4 August until 2 May each year. It was not lit during the summer due to the midnight sun in the region.

See also

Lighthouses in Norway
List of lighthouses in Norway

References

External links
 LofotenFyr.no - Værøy Lighthouse Webpage
 Norsk Fyrhistorisk Forening 
 Picture of Værøy Lighthouse

Lighthouses completed in 1880
Værøy
Lighthouses in Nordland